Victor Hernandez may refer to:

 Victor Hernández Cruz (born 1949), New York poet
 Víctor Hugo Hernández (born 1986), Mexican footballer
 Victor Hernández Stumpfhauser, Mexican composer